In type theory, a typing rule is an inference rule that describes how a type system assigns a type to a syntactic construction. These rules may be applied by the type system to determine if a program is well-typed and what type expressions have.  A prototypical example of the use of typing rules is in defining type inference in the simply typed lambda calculus, which is the internal language of Cartesian closed categories.

Notation 
Typing rules specify the structure of a typing relation that relates syntactic terms to their types. Syntactically, the typing relation is usually denoted by a colon, so for example  denotes that an expression  has type . The rules themselves are usually specified using the notation of natural deduction. For example, the following typing rules specify the typing relation for a simple language of booleans:

Each rule states that the conclusion below the line may be derived from the premises above the line. The first two rules have no premises above the line, so they are axioms. The third rule has premises above the line (specifically, three premises), so it is an inference rule.

In programming languages, the type of a variable depends on where it is bound, which necessitates context-sensitive typing rules. These rules are given by a typing judgment, usually written , which states that an expression  has type  under a typing context  that relates variables to their types. This notation can be used to give typing rules for variable references and lambda abstraction in the simply typed lambda calculus:

Similarly, the following typing rule describes the  construct of Standard ML:

Not all systems of typing rules directly specify a type checking algorithm. For example, the typing rule for applying a parametrically polymorphic function in the Hindley–Milner type system requires "guessing" the appropriate type at which the function should be instantiated. Adapting a declarative rule system to a decidable algorithm requires the production of a separate, algorithmic system that can be proven to specify the same typing relation.

See also
 Judgment (mathematical logic)
 Type system
 Type theory
 Curry–Howard correspondence
 Sequent calculus

References

Further reading 
  

Data types
Program analysis
Type theory